Harvey B. Knudson (June 26, 1903 – June 29, 1978) was an American attorney, jurist, and politician who served as a justice of the North Dakota Supreme Court from 1965 to 1975 and served in both chambers of the North Dakota Legislative Assembly.

Early life and education 
Knudson was born in Finley, North Dakota on June 26, 1903. He was the son of Enok Knudson and Josephine Emilia (Hansen) Knudson, both of whom were of Norwegian heritage. He attended elementary school and high school in Finley. He received his law degree from the University of North Dakota School of Law in 1931

Career 
After graduating from law school, Knudson established a legal practice in Finley, where he remained until 1937. In 1937, he moved to Mayville, North Dakota where he practiced law until being elected to the North Dakota Supreme Court in 1964. While practicing law in Mayville, Knudson served in the North Dakota House of Representatives from 1937 to 1939 and in the North Dakota Senate from 1951 to 1959.

In 1964, at the age of 61, Knudson was elected to the North Dakota Supreme Court. He served on the court for ten years before retiring in 1975.

Knudson died at the age of 75 on June 29, 1978.

References

External links
Harvey B. Knudson biography
North Dakota Supreme Court official website

1903 births
1978 deaths
Members of the North Dakota House of Representatives
North Dakota state senators
Justices of the North Dakota Supreme Court
People from Traill County, North Dakota
People from Steele County, North Dakota
American people of Norwegian descent
20th-century American judges

20th-century American politicians